Otín is a municipality and village in Žďár nad Sázavou District in the Vysočina Region of the Czech Republic. It has about 300 inhabitants.

Administrative parts
Villages of Geršov and Pohořílky are administrative parts of Otín.

Gallery

References

Villages in Žďár nad Sázavou District